This article describes the grammar of Afrikaans, a language spoken in South Africa and Namibia which originated from 17th century Dutch.

Verbs
There is no distinction for example between the infinitive and present forms of verbs, with the exception of these two verbs:

This phenomenon is somewhat akin to English verbs, since infinitives are mostly equivalent to verbs in the simple tense, except in English singular 3rd person forms, in which case an extra -s is added.

In addition, Afrikaans verbs do not conjugate differently depending on the subject. For example,

For most verbs, the preterite (e.g. I watched) has been completely replaced by the perfect (e.g. I have watched), or in storytelling by the present tense (i.e. the use of a historical present, which is sometimes also employed in Dutch). The only common exceptions to this are the modal verbs (see the following table) and the verb wees "be" (preterite form was).

The following four full verbs also have (rarely used) preterite forms:

Several verbs have irregular perfect forms which are used alongside regular forms, sometimes with different meanings:

The verb baar (to bear, to give birth) has two past participles: gebaar and gebore. The former is used in the active voice ("she has borne") and the latter in the passive voice ("she was born"). This is akin to Dutch, in which the verb baren has the past participles gebaard and geboren, with a similar distinction. Compare also the distinction between English born and borne.

Modern Afrikaans also lacks a pluperfect (e.g. I had watched). Instead, the pluperfect, like the preterite, is expressed using the perfect.

The perfect is constructed with the auxiliary verb het + past participle, which—except for the verb hê (past participle gehad), separable verbs such as reghelp (past participle reggehelp) and verbs with beginnings such as ver- and ont- (verkoop, ontmoet are both infinitive and past participle)—is formed regularly by adding the prefix ge- to the verb's infinitive/present form. For example,

Ek breek – I break
Ek het dit gebreek – I broke it, I have broken it, I had broken it
An object is necessary in this case, otherwise it implies that the subject (ek) is broken.

The future tense is in turn indicated using the auxiliary sal + infinitive. For example,

Ek sal kom – I will come (or literally I shall come)

The conditional is indicated by the preterite form sou + infinitive. For example,

Ek sou kom – I would come (literally I should come)

Like other Germanic languages, Afrikaans also has an analytic passive voice that is formed in the present tense by using the auxiliary verb word (to become) + past participle, and, in the past tense, by using the auxiliary is + past participle. For example,

Dit word gemaak – It is being made
Dit is (Dis) gemaak – It is made, It was made, It has been made (so it already exists)

Formal written Afrikaans also admits the construction of was gemaak to indicate passive voice in the pluperfect, which in this case corresponds to had been made. The meaning of the sentence can change based on which auxiliary verb is used (is/was), e.g. is gemaak implies that something has been made and is still in existence today, whereas was gemaak implies that something had been made, but was destroyed or lost.

The present participle is normally formed with the suffix -ende (kom/komende), but sometimes it is irregular (wees/synde, hê/hebbende, sterf/sterwende, bly/blywende), although this is considered archaic for function verbs. Sometimes there is a spelling change to the root which does not affect the pronunciation (maak/makende, weet/wetende)

The verb wees uniquely has subjunctive forms, although they are seldom ever used in the present day: sy is the present subjunctive form, and ware is the past subjunctive form.

Nouns
Nouns in Afrikaans, as in modern Dutch, have no inflectional case system, and do not have grammatical gender (unlike modern Dutch). However, there is a distinction between the singular and plural forms of nouns. The most common plural marker is the suffix -e, but several common nouns form their plural instead by adding a final -s. A number of common nouns have irregular plurals:

No grammatical case distinction exists for nouns, adjectives and articles.

Adjectives
Adjectives may, however, be inflected when they precede a noun. As a general rule, polysyllabic adjectives are normally inflected when used as attributive adjectives. Monosyllabic attributive adjectives may or may not be inflected, depending on the historical forms of the adjective. 
Inflected adjectives retain the ending -e and for some adjectives, word-final consonants that were lost in attributive uses are retained. For example, the final t following an  sound that deleted in predicative uses in like reg (cf. Dutch recht), is retained when the adjective is inflected (regte). A similar phenomenon applies to the apocope of t after . For example, the adjective vas becomes vaste when inflected. Conversely, adjectives ending in -d (pronounced ) or -g (pronounced ) following a long vowel or diphthong, lose the -d and -g when inflected. For example, look at the inflected form of:

In some exceptional cases, after the syncope of the intervocalic consonant, there is also an additional apocope of the inflection marker. For example,

oud (old) – ou (when it precedes a noun)

Broadly speaking, the same morphological changes that apply to inflected adjectives also apply in the formation of the plural of nouns. For example, the plural of vraag (question) is vrae (questions).

Pronouns
Remnants of the case distinction remain in the pronoun system. For example,

*Archaic/regional variant

No case distinction is made for the plural pronouns.
There is often no distinction between object and possessive pronouns when used before nouns. For example,

my – my, me
ons – our (the alternative form onse is now considered archaic)

An exception to the previous rule is the 3rd person singular masculine or neuter, where Afrikaans clearly distinguishes between hom (him) and sy (his). Likewise, the neuter pronoun dit (it, subject or object) is distinguished from the possessive sy (its), and the term hy can emphatically be used to describe inanimate objects in the same way as the feminine in English, such as in the Rooibaard hot sauce brand's slogan "hy brand mooi rooi" ("He burns beautifully red"), referring to its product's intense spice. For 3rd person plural pronouns, whereas hulle can also mean their, a variant hul is frequently used to mean "their" so as to differentiate between their and they/them. Similarly, julle when meaning your has a possessive variant jul.

Syntax

Word order
Afrikaans has a strict word order, described in many South African text books using the so-called "STOMPI rule". The name of the rule indicates the order in which the parts of a sentence should appear.

Word order in Afrikaans follows broadly the same rules as in Dutch: in main clauses, the finite verb appears in "second position" (V2 word order), while subordinate clauses (e.g. content clauses and relative clauses) have subject–object–verb order, with the verb at (or near) the end of the clause.

As in Dutch and German, infinitives and past participles appear in final position in main clauses, split from the corresponding auxiliary verb. For example,

Afrikaans: Hy het 'n huis gekoop.
Dutch: Hĳ heeft een huis gekocht.
English: He (has) bought a house.

Relative clauses usually begin with the pronoun "wat", used both for personal and non-personal antecedents. For example,

Afrikaans: Die man wat hier gebly het was ŉ Amerikaner.
Dutch: De man die hier bleef was een Amerikaan.
English: The man who stayed here was an American.

Alternatively, a relative clause may begin with a preposition + "wie" when referring to a personal antecedent, or an agglutination between "waar" and a preposition when referring to a non-personal antecedent.

Double negative
A particular feature of Afrikaans is its use of the double negative. For example,

 Afrikaans: Hy kan nie Afrikaans praat nie. (lit. He can not Afrikaans speak not.)
 Dutch: Hĳ kan geen Afrikaans spreken.
 English: He cannot speak Afrikaans.

Both French and San origins have been suggested for double negation in Afrikaans. While double negation is still found in Low Franconian dialects in West-Flanders and in some "isolated" villages in the centre of the Netherlands (i.e. Garderen), it takes a different form, which is not found in Afrikaans. The following is an example:

*Compare with "Ek wil nie dit doen nie", which changes the meaning to "I do not want to do this specific thing." Whereas "Ek wil dit nie doen nie" emphasises the unwillingness to act, "Ek wil nie dit doen nie" emphasises the unwillingness to do the specified action.

The double negative construction has been fully integrated into standard Afrikaans and its proper use follows a set of fairly complex rules as the examples below show:

The word het in Dutch does not correspond to het in Afrikaans. The het in Dutch means it in English. The Dutch word that corresponds to het in Afrikaans (in these cases) is heb.

Note that in these cases, most Dutch speakers would say instead:

A notable exception to this is the use of the negating grammar form that coincides with negating the English present participle. In this case there is only a single negation.

Certain words in Afrikaans arise due to grammar. For example, moet nie, which literally means "must not", usually becomes moenie; although one does not have to write or say it like this, virtually all Afrikaans speakers will change the two words to moenie in the same way as do not shifts to don't in English.

See also
His genitive

Notes

References

 See also 

Grammar
Languages of South Africa
North Sea Germanic grammars